Alismaticarpum alatum is a fossil species of aquatic plants in the family Alismataceae.  It is a form taxon created for winged fruits whose precise assignment to a genus is not possible. Fossil fruits of this species are known from the Oligocene of England.

References

Alismataceae
Alismataceae genera
Oligocene plants
Prehistoric angiosperm genera
Monotypic Alismatales genera